Nesmrtelná teta is a 1993 Czech film written and directed by Zdeněk Zelenka.

References

External links 
 CSFD.cz - Nesmrtelná teta
 

1993 films
Czech fantasy comedy films
Czechoslovak fantasy films
1990s Czech-language films
Films based on fairy tales
Films based on works by Karel Jaromír Erben
Czech Lion Awards winners (films)